Ann T. Lenczewski (born May 9, 1960) is a Minnesota politician and former member of the Minnesota House of Representatives. A member of the Minnesota Democratic–Farmer–Labor Party (DFL), she represented District 50B, which included portions of the city of Bloomington in Hennepin County in the Twin Cities metropolitan area.

Early life, education, and career
Lenczewski graduated from Bloomington Jefferson High School in Bloomington, then went on to the College of Saint Benedict in St. Joseph, graduating with a B.A. in Psychology. She later attended graduate school at the Humphrey Institute of Public Affairs at the University of Minnesota. She served on the Bloomington Planning and Parks Commission, and was elected to the Bloomington City Council in 1993, serving from 1994 to 1998.

Minnesota House of Representatives
Lenczewski was first elected in 1998 and was re-elected every two years since then. She resigned effective December 15, 2015 to join Lockridge Grindal Nauen P.L.L.P.

Personal life
Lenczewski is married to Nels Erickson. They have four children and reside in Bloomington, Minnesota.

References

External links 

 Official Minnesota House of Representatives website
 Minnesota Public Radio Votetracker: Rep. Ann Lenczewski
 Project Votesmart - Rep. Ann Lenczewski Profile

1960 births
Living people
Humphrey School of Public Affairs alumni
People from Bloomington, Minnesota
Democratic Party members of the Minnesota House of Representatives
Women state legislators in Minnesota
21st-century American politicians
21st-century American women politicians